Star Trek: Deep Space Nine is the third live-action television series in the Star Trek franchise and aired in syndication from January 1993 through June 1999. There were a total of 173 (original broadcast & DVD) or 176 (syndicated) episodes over the show's seven seasons, which are listed here in chronological order by original airdate, which match the episode order in each season's DVD set.

The first episode, "Emissary"; the fourth season premiere, "The Way of the Warrior"; and the series finale, "What You Leave Behind", originally aired as two-hour presentations, but were subsequently aired as sets of two one-hour episodes in reruns.

Series overview

Episodes

Season 1 (1993)

Season 2 (1993–94)

Season 3 (1994–95)

Season 4 (1995–96)

Season 5 (1996–97)

Season 6 (1997–98)

Season 7 (1998–99)

Reception
In 1999, Trek Nation's Greg Fuller said the series had been successful among its peers, writing, "Even when it became a near-serial show (usually, long-term serial shows are ratings disasters -- witness Babylon 5) airing in prime-time in less than 60 percent of the nation, DS9 managed well over a 4.0 average in its final two years. As a general rule, a syndicated show needs to maintain a 3.0 to be successful, DS9 always maintained that despite the strikes against it."

In 2019, CBR rated all 31 seasons (across seven series at that time, including the first season of Star Trek: Discovery) of the Star Trek franchise, separately ranking each season of each series. They rated Season 6 of Star Trek: Deep Space Nine as the very best season of any Star Trek season up to that time.
 CBR rankings 
 1 – Season 6
 6 – Season 7
 15 – Season 5
 18 – Season 2
 20 – Season 3
 21 – Season 4
 26 – Season 1

In 2016, The Washington Post  called the Dominion war story arc in the later season of Star Trek: Deep Space Nine possibly the "richest narrative" of the Star Trek universe.

See also

 Lists of Star Trek episodes

References

External links 
 DS9 episode list at Memory Alpha the Star Trek Wiki
 

Deep Space 9
 
Star Trek: Deep Space Nine

ca:Star Trek: Deep Space Nine#Capítols